Motuna, or Siwai, is a Papuan language of Bougainville Province, Papua New Guinea. It is spoken primarily in Siwai Rural LLG. The current number of speakers is difficult to estimate since the latest figure (6,000 + 600) is from the 1970 census.

Phonology

Vowels

Consonants 

The structure of the language is CV(C), with the coda being an archiphoneme realized as a glottal stop, glottal fricative, or a nasal (homorganic to the next consonant or velar if word-final).

Grammar
Siwai is an agglutinating language that undergoes a substantial amount of morphophonological fusion. Heads and dependents are both marked. It shows case on NPs. It is ergative/absolutive. It shows extremely complex prefixation and suffixation in verbs, kinship terms, classifiers, and numerals. It tends to be verb-final, with A and O in either order. NPs can be omitted when understood from context.

Gender
Siwai exhibits five genders: masculine, feminine, diminutive, local, and manner. These are marked in the singular forms only since dual and paucal forms are all marked like diminutive and plurals are marked like masculine. These genders coexist with fifty-one semantic types, marked by classifiers. These in turn are combined with numerals, demonstratives, and possessive pronouns.

Number
The language has four numbers: singular, dual, paucal, and plural. Nouns show all four while pronouns are either singular and non-singular. First-person non-singular shows a distinction in inclusive and exclusive.

Verbs
Verbs mark person and number of core arguments. It has split S morphology and active/middle voice distinction. Verbs also mark one of fourteen TAM categories.

Structure
The verb structure consists primarily of suffixes: 
(i) verb stem 
(ii) bound pronominal morphemes, cross-referencing the person and number of core argument(s)
(iii) a TAM suffix
(iv) non-medial verbs that are fully inflected cross-reference the gender of the topical argument.
(iv′) other non-medial verbs and same-subject medial verbs mark nothing else
(iv″) different-subject medial verbs have a form indicating both aspect and switch-reference.

There are some verbs that are exceptions to this structure, such as the Definite Future suffix which requires no gender marking, and some TAM morphemes in medial verbs.

Valency
Siwai has four types of valency structure:
(a) plain transitives take A and O
(b) extended transitives take A, O, and E
(c) plain intransitives take S
(d) extended intransitives take S and E
Some verbs are ambitransitive and take either active or middle voice. The voice system of the language is thus a "verbal diathesis" where the configuration of core arguments determine the active or middle voice.

Classes
There are five main verb classes, which are determined by which cross-referencing morphemes they take:
(1) Sa verbs
(2) Sa verbs
(3) Irregular verbs ('be, exist', 'go', 'come', 'die', 'cry')
(4) Ambitransitive (active-middle) verbs
(a) 'reflexive action' (S=O=A)
(b) 'spontaneous process/event' (S=O)
(c) 'less agentive activity' (S=A)
(5) Middle-only verbs
(a) 'bodily action'
(b) 'spontaneous process/event'
(c) 'complex activity'

Syntax
Similar to many other Papuan languages, Siwai has medial verbs which are in the middle of a sentence and indicate TAM and switch-reference.

External links 
 
 Paradisec has two collections of Arthur Cappell's materials (AC1, AC2) that include Siwai language materials.

References

Languages of the Autonomous Region of Bougainville
Object–verb–subject languages
South Bougainville languages